A quaternionic matrix is a matrix whose elements are quaternions.

Matrix operations
The quaternions form a noncommutative ring, and therefore addition and multiplication can be defined for quaternionic matrices as for matrices over any ring.

Addition. The sum of two quaternionic matrices A and B is defined in the usual way by element-wise addition:

Multiplication. The product of two quaternionic matrices A and B also follows the usual definition for matrix multiplication. For it to be defined, the number of columns of A must equal the number of rows of B. Then the entry in the ith row and jth column of the product is the dot product of the ith row of the first matrix with the jth column of the second matrix. Specifically:

For example, for

the product is

Since quaternionic multiplication is noncommutative, care must be taken to preserve the order of the factors when computing the product of matrices.

The identity for this multiplication is, as expected, the diagonal matrix I = diag(1, 1, ... , 1). Multiplication follows the usual laws of associativity and distributivity. The trace of a matrix is defined as the sum of the diagonal elements, but in general

Left scalar multiplication, and right scalar multiplication are defined by

Again, since multiplication is not commutative some care must be taken in the order of the factors.

Determinants
There is no natural way to define a determinant for (square) quaternionic matrices so that the values of the determinant are quaternions. Complex valued determinants can be defined however. The quaternion a + bi + cj + dk can be represented as the 2×2 complex matrix
 
This defines a map Ψmn from the m by n quaternionic matrices to the 2m by 2n complex matrices by replacing each entry in the quaternionic matrix by its 2 by 2 complex representation. The complex valued determinant of a square quaternionic matrix A is then defined as det(Ψ(A)). Many of the usual laws for determinants hold; in particular, an n by n matrix is invertible if and only if its determinant is nonzero.

Applications
Quaternionic matrices are used in quantum mechanics  and in the treatment of multibody problems.

References

Matrices
Linear algebra